The Bay City Rollers are a Scottish pop rock band known for their worldwide teen idol popularity in the 1970s. They have been called the "tartan teen sensations from Edinburgh" and one of many acts heralded as the "biggest group since the Beatles.

The group's line up had many changes over the years, but the classic roster during its peak in popularity included guitarists Eric Faulkner and Stuart Wood, singer Les McKeown, bassist Alan Longmuir, and drummer Derek Longmuir. The current line-up (since 2018) includes original guitarist Stuart "Woody" Wood, singer Ian Thomson, bassist Marcus Cordock, and drummer Jamie McGrory.

The Bay City Rollers have sold 120 million records worldwide, making them one of the best-selling artists of all time.

History

Early days and formation: 1964–1973
In 1964, a trio called the Ambassadors was formed in Edinburgh, Scotland by 16-year-old Alan Longmuir on acoustic guitar, his younger brother Derek Longmuir on drums, and their older cousin Neil Porteous on acoustic guitar. The group never performed publicly under this name, just a family wedding where they covered "Wake Up Little Susie". They changed their name to the Saxons, and Derek invited a friend from school, Gordon "Nobby" Clark, to be the lead singer. Porteous moved from acoustic to electric guitar, and Alan Longmuir followed suit by changing to electric bass. The Saxons played occasional dance hall concerts while the band members completed their schooling or worked during the day (Alan apprenticed as a plumber). Porteous left the band in July 1965, with new guitarist Dave Pettigrew filling the spot after answering an advertisement placed by the band in an Edinburgh newspaper. Pettigrew was more advanced musically than the others, and pushed the band to improve. Their repertoire included American R&B/pop songs such as "Please Mr. Postman" and "Heat Wave". They played at least one gig at the Gonk Club as the Deadbeats, but they discovered a conflict: Another band was playing locally as Rock Bottom and the Deadbeats.

While taking a technical class at Napier College, Alan met fellow plumbing student Gregory Ellison, who joined the Saxons on electric guitar, with Pettigrew shifting to keyboards. Gregory's older brother Mike joined as a second lead singer, allowing more complex harmonies, especially useful for the Motown songs they liked to perform. The band convinced Tam Paton, a former big band leader and influential local band and club manager, to audition them at the Longmuirs' house. Paton booked them for a Thursday night at his club, the Palais, then assigned them to open for the Hipple People at Top Storey. More gigs followed.

More successful now, the Saxons moved out of the Longmuirs' back room to practice in Hermiston at a church. They played a couple of contemporary Kinks numbers but favored American songs, including a new one: "C.C. Rider" by Mitch Ryder and the Detroit Wheels. Desiring a better name for the band, they settled on "Rollers", but needed a more powerful American-sounding term in front of that. Derek Longmuir threw a dart at a map of the United States, landing first on Arkansas. This did not meet anyone's approval, so a second dart was thrown. It landed near Bay City, Michigan. The band agreed on the name, the Bay City Rollers. Short-term members from this period included bassist David Paton (from 1969 to 1970) and keyboardist Billy Lyall (1969–71), who went on to be founding members of another Edinburgh band Pilot.

After signing with Bell Records, the band's first hit was "Keep on Dancing" (UK No. 9, 1971), a cover of a 1965 hit by the Gentrys. Upon this release's success, they made appearances on BBC One's Top of the Pops.

Several non-charting singles were released over the following two years. This period saw the addition of long-term member guitarist Eric Faulkner. In mid-1973, they narrowly missed the UK Singles Chart with their fourth single, "Saturday Night". By the end of 1973, Clark had become disillusioned with the band's musical direction and decided to leave just when his recording of "Remember (Sha-La-La-La)" climbed the charts to No. 6. He was replaced as lead singer by Les McKeown. A couple of months later, in early 1974, what became known as the classic line-up was completed; guitarist John Devine was replaced by Stuart "Woody" Wood.

In 1987 Les McKewon was a guest on Jonathan Ross' chat show where he told Jonathan that The Bay City Rollers did not perform on the first 4 singles.

Breakthrough: 1974–1975
In late 1973, McKeown recorded lead vocals on "Remember (Sha-La-La-La)", and a lead-in to a series of UK chart hits. 16-year-old Stuart Wood completed the "classic five" line-up in February 1974, a week after the band had debuted the "Remember" single on Top of the Pops. (John Devine had mimed the piano part). By early 1975, the band was well on the way to achieving global success. The "classic five" line-up consisted of: Alan Longmuir, Derek Longmuir, Stuart "Woody" Wood, Eric Faulkner and Les McKeown.

Beginning with "Remember" (UK No. 6), the Rollers' popularity exploded, and they released a string of hits on the UK chart. Following in succession were "Shang-a-Lang" (UK No. 2), "Summerlove Sensation" (UK No. 3), and "All of Me Loves All of You" (UK No. 4).

By early 1975, they were one of the biggest-selling acts in the UK. The successful 1975 UK tour prompted newspaper headlines about the rise of "Rollermania" (a take-off on Beatlemania a decade before). The Rollers were the subject of a 20-week UK television series, Shang-a-Lang.

A cover of the Four Seasons' "Bye, Bye, Baby" stayed at No. 1 in the UK for six weeks in March and April 1975, selling nearly a million copies and becoming the biggest seller of the year. The subsequent single, "Give a Little Love" topped the charts in July 1975, achieving their second No. 1 hit. Two full-length LPs were produced during this period: Once Upon a Star (1975) and Wouldn't You Like It? (1975). Faulkner and Wood undertook the majority of the songwriting duties.

By this time, Bay City Rollers fans had a completely distinctive style of dress, featuring calf-length tartan trousers and tartan scarves.

English singer-songwriter Nick Lowe wrote a "jaundiced" (in Lowe's words) paean to the band titled "Bay City Rollers We Love You". The track was "carefully sculpted" to be poor enough to get Lowe out of a recording contract with United Artists. The strategy backfired. UA issued the record as by the Tartan Horde, which was the name given to Rollers fans in England, and it became a substantial hit in Japan. Lowe was obliged to record a follow-up song called "Rollers Show", which did not meet with the same commercial success. This follow-up song was included on the U.S. release of Lowe's first album Pure Pop for Now People.

World impact: 1976

As the group's popularity swelled to superstardom in the UK, a concerted effort was made by Arista Records (the record company that evolved from Bell) to launch the Rollers in North America. New Arista head, Clive Davis, was instrumental in grooming and overseeing the project. His work paid off, as in late 1975, the Rollers reached No. 1 on the US Billboard Hot 100 with "Saturday Night". "Saturday Night" had missed the UK chart completely two years earlier. The Rollers gave the track their American debut, via a satellite-link performance on Saturday Night Live, with Howard Cosell. In Canada, it fared equally well, hitting No. 1 on the RPM national singles chart on 10 January 1976. The Bay City Rollers (1975) album (North American release only) hit No. 1 in the same chart on 7 February.

A second North American hit came with "Money Honey", written by Faulkner and Wood, which hit No. 9 in the US. In Canada, it fared better, following its predecessor to the top, giving them their second No. 1 in the RPM national singles chart on 13 March 1976.

The North America/Japan release album Rock n' Roll Love Letter (1976) jumped from No. 25, to the top position in a single week in Canada. This deposed their own Bay City Rollers (1975) at No. 1 on the national chart, on 27 March 1976, However, it only managed to achieve the No. 31 spot on the U.S. Billboard chart.

They were also extremely popular in Australia. One example of their popularity, was put into the book about Countdown – the Australian TV music show which ran from 1974–1987. Their Countdown appearance in October 1976 coincided with a total eclipse of the sun. Director Ted Emery recalled:

Alan Longmuir had left the group by early 1976, due to both the pressures of the band's success and feeling discomfort at being a member of a teen band whilst in his late twenties. He was replaced for seven months by 17-year-old Ian Mitchell from Northern Ireland; he was the first band member born outside Edinburgh. With Mitchell, the group released an album titled Dedication (1976), and hit the charts with a cover version of the Dusty Springfield song "I Only Want to Be with You. " The song reached US No. 12, as well as "Yesterday's Hero" (featuring live material from a 1976 personal appearance in Toronto's Nathan Phillips Square), and "Dedication".

1977–1979

As the Rollers' popularity waned, the shuffling of personnel continued; Mitchell quit the band. He was replaced by guitarist Pat McGlynn. Further struggles involved the direction of their sound, as the members wished to pursue more sophisticated styles. They settled on David Bowie's producer, Harry Maslin, and in August 1977 released It's a Game as a four-piece group, comprising McKeown, Wood, Faulkner and Derek Longmuir. The It's a Game tour was recorded in 1977 at Japan's Budokan Hall, and was later released in 2001 as Rollerworld: Live at the Budokan 1977.

On the tour, they covered "It's a Game", an unsuccessful 1973 single by String Driven Thing, to give them their final UK Top 20 hit (#16 in May 1977). Oddly enough, this single provided them with their highest-charting German hit, reaching No. 4 in the same year. The follow-up "You Made Me Believe in Magic" made No. 34 in July in the UK and No. 10 in the U.S., and this single was their final major success.

The Bay City Rollers were on The Krofft Superstar Hour, later named the Bay City Rollers Show, an hour-long show that aired from September 9, 1978 to January 27, 1979.

New singer, new name
At the end of 1978, the band had split with McKeown, then fired manager Tam Paton shortly after, and decided to continue in a more new wave, rock-oriented sound. Their name was now The Rollers. South African-born Duncan Faure joined the band as new lead vocalist, guitarist and songwriter. With Faure, the line-up produced three albums: Elevator (1979), Voxx (1980) and Ricochet (1981). Following the expiry of the band's Arista contract, none of the releases sold as well as expected, and they stopped touring by late 1981.

The A.V. Club compared Ricochet to the pop/new wave style of The Cars and recommended the album be "rescued from obscurity".

1980s–present
During the 1980s and 1990s, there were a few short tours. Seven past members played Japan in 1982, and again in 1983. A reunion album, Breakout, was released in Japan and Australia in 1985, and added drummer George Spencer. Breakout was written primarily by McKeown and McGlynn with minor contributions from Faulkner, Wood, and Mitchell.

In the late 1980s, a version of the band called the New Rollers was formed featuring Faulkner on lead vocals, Karen Prosser on vocals, Jason Medvec on guitar, Andy Boakes on bass, and Mark Roberts on drums. The band toured extensively throughout the US and Canada as well as tours of the UK and Australia. This group also released an independent four-song EP titled Party Harty.

In 1990, Wood and Alan Longmuir joined with Faulkner to tour under the Bay City Rollers name and issued several CDs of re-recordings of the old Roller tunes.

In 1996, the classic line-up reunited and performed "Saturday Night" on a Japanese television show to celebrate the 20th anniversary of Rollermania.

The classic line-up (minus Derek Longmuir) performed a one-off New Year's Eve millennium concert, the last official Bay City Rollers concert (1999–2000) in the shadow of Edinburgh Castle in Scotland. Interest was rekindled in the UK by various television documentaries about the group; and the television-advertised compilation Very Best of the Bay City Rollers entered the UK Albums Chart on release in 2004 at No. 11.

During the late 2000's, Ian Mitchell led his own Bay City Rollers band, which included lead vocalist Kyle Vincent, but this should not be considered an official Bay City Rollers reunion because Mitchell was the only ex-Roller involved.

On 22 September 2015, the Bay City Rollers, including McKeown, Wood, and Alan Longmuir, announced they were reforming and would play a show at the Glasgow Barrowlands on 20 December. Eric Faulkner was unable to contribute because of health concerns, almost dying in February 2015 after contracting viral encephalitis. The band released one new single, "Boomerang", and discussed plans for a new album. The reunion continued into 2016 before Wood ended the reunited line-up on 9 July 2016 because no shows were being booked for the so-called reunion. After the 2015 Christmas shows Les was booking shows only for himself and his band during 2016 (Except T In The Park) which caused the reunion to end. Plans for a new album and various tours that were hoped to take place in 2017 never materialised. Prior to the reunion and after the end of the tour, McKeown continued to tour as "Les McKeown's Bay City Rollers".

On 27 February 2018, Wood announced that a non official "new generation" Bay City Rollers would be performing in Tokyo, Japan in June of the same year. The band comprises Wood on guitar, actor Ian Thomson on lead vocals and guitar, Marcus Cordock on bass, and Jamie McGrory on drums.

Bassist Alan Longmuir died on 2 July 2018 after falling ill while on holiday with his wife in Mexico. His autobiography I Ran with the Gang: My Life in and Out of The Bay City Rollers was published posthumously in November 2018; the book was written with Martin Knight. In his book, Alan Longmuir mentioned his hope for McKeown and Wood to put aside their differences and reunite one more time. In 2019, after rumors related to Alan Longmuir's wishes, both McKeown and Wood denied any chance of another reunion and did not want to work with each other, though McKeown did mention his desire to work with Faulkner.

After both McKeown's and Wood's bands were sidelined by the coronavirus pandemic, McKeown mentioned in August 2020 that he would be willing to reunite with Wood again with more planning.

On 1 September 2020, Ian Mitchell died at the age of 62 after suffering from throat cancer.

On 20 April 2021, Les McKeown died aged 65.

Financial disputes

According to the BBC, the Bay City Rollers sold 120 million records.

In March 2007, six former members of the group (Faure plus the "classic line-up") announced a lawsuit against Arista Records in hopes of claiming what they described as "tens of millions of dollars" of unpaid royalties. Gordon "Nobby" Clark threatened to sue the other band members if their lawsuit was successful, stating that he was the creative force behind the band's success, even though he left the group in 1973, before the bulk of their fame and fortune began.

In September 2010, Clark, Ian Mitchell and Pat McGlynn filed a complaint in the courts in the United States against the six members (Faure plus the "classic line-up") over being excluded from the case against Arista records. Clark, Mitchell and McGlynn were seeking to have their rights determined and were seeking financial damages against the other Bay City Rollers for alleged breach of contract. In 2013, a judge in the United States Circuit Court of Appeals ruled against the three due to the statute of frauds, which establishes that certain agreements must be in writing under certain conditions, and the appellate judge's ruling stated: "A claim for unjust enrichment must be based on the value of plaintiffs' contribution to the joint effort of the band at the time it made the relevant records, not on the income stream resulting from a revival over thirty years later."

In March 2011, a New York judge determined that the Bay City Rollers could move forward with their four-year-old lawsuit against Arista Records. Arista denied responsibility for the majority of the royalties, citing a New York statute of limitations. The statute limits plaintiffs from recovering damages post six years in contract disputes, which therefore would negate the Rollers' claims for royalties incurred before 2001. However, because Arista had continued to promise the Bay City Rollers their royalties in writing, the judge ruled that the statute was not applicable.

After almost a decade, the legal battle came to an end with an out-of-court settlement in 2016. Arista Records' parent company Sony Music is believed to have paid $3.5 million, with each band member receiving £70,000.

Members

Current members
 Stuart "Woody" Wood – backing and occasional lead vocals, rhythm and lead guitars, keyboards, bass, mandolin (1974–1981, 1982–1985, 1990, 1996, 1999–2000, 2015–2016, 2018-present)
 Ian Thomson – lead vocals, guitar (2018–present)
 Marcus Cordock – bass, vocals (2018–present)
 Jamie McGrory – drums (2018–present)

Former members
 Alan Longmuir – backing and occasional lead vocals, bass, rhythm guitar, piano, accordion (1964–1976, 1978–1981, 1982–1983, 1990, 1996, 1999–2000, 2015–2016; died 2018)
 Derek Longmuir – drums, percussion (1964–1981, 1982–1983, 1996)
 Neil Porteous – guitar (1964–1965)
 Gordon "Nobby" Clark – lead vocals (1965–1973)
 Dave Pettigrew – guitar, keyboards (1965–1968)
 Gregory Ellison – guitar (1966–1968)
 Mike Ellison – vocals (1966)
 Keith Norman - keyboards (1967-1969)
 David Paton – guitar (1968–1970)
 Alan Dunn - keyboards (1969)
 Billy Lyall – keyboards (1969–1971)
 Eric Manclark - guitar (1970-1971)
 Neil Henderson - guitar (1970-1972)
 Archie Marr - keyboards (1971-1972)
 John Devine – guitar (1972–1974)
 Eric Faulkner – backing and occasional lead vocals, lead and rhythm guitars, violin, mandolin, bass (1972–1981, 1982–1985, 1990, 1996, 1999–2000)
 Les McKeown – lead vocals, occasional guitar (1973–1978, 1982–1985, 1996, 1999–2000, 2015–2016; died 2021)
 Ian Mitchell – backing and occasional lead vocals, rhythm guitar, bass (1976, 1982–1985; died 2020)
 Pat McGlynn – rhythm guitar, bass (1976–1977, 1982–1985)
 Duncan Faure – vocals, guitar (1978–1981)
 George Spencer – drums (1985)

In later years, but before McKeown's death, there were usually at least two or three bands featuring one former BCR member touring as The Bay City Rollers or some variation of the name. These were most recently held by Wood and McKeown (before McKeown's death), and Wood's most recent band is still active and currently the only group touring as the Bay City Rollers.

Timeline

Discography

Studio albums

 Rollin' (1974)
 Once Upon a Star (1975)
 Bay City Rollers (1975) 
 Wouldn't You Like It? (1975)
 Rock n' Roll Love Letter (1976)
 Dedication (1976) 
 It's a Game (1977)
 Strangers in the Wind (1978)
 Elevator (1979)
 Voxx (1980) 
 Ricochet (1981)
 Breakout '85 (1985)
 A Christmas Shang-A-Lang (2015)

Christmas Single 2021

 Rollin' Into Christmas

References

Further reading
 Brigitte Tast, Hans-Jürgen Tast: Wie weit ist vorbei? Ein Konzert, eine Party und Meldungen aus der ganzen Welt. Kulleraugen – Visuelle Kommunikation Nr. 48, Schellerten 2016, .

External links
 
 
  as Les McKeown's 70's Bay City Rollers

 
1964 establishments in Scotland
2020 disestablishments in Scotland
Musical groups established in 1966
Musical groups disestablished in 1987
Scottish boy bands
Scottish pop music groups
Scottish pop rock music groups
Scottish glam rock groups
Musical groups from Edinburgh
Musical groups reestablished in 2015
Musical groups disestablished in 2020
Bell Records artists
Arista Records artists
Epic Records artists